Sainte-Eulalie is a municipality in the Nicolet-Yamaska RCM in the Centre-du-Québec region of Quebec, Canada, situated at the crossroads of Autoroutes 55, 20 and 955. The population as of the Canada 2021 Census was 984.

Sainte-Eulalie is also the home of Hydro-Québec's Nicolet static inverter station along Autoroute 20, west of its junction with Autoroute 55, as part of its HVDC Quebec - New England Transmission circuit.

Demographics

Population
Population trend:

Language
Mother tongue language (2021)

See also
List of municipalities in Quebec

References

Municipalities in Quebec
Incorporated places in Centre-du-Québec
Nicolet-Yamaska Regional County Municipality